Vardaan is a 1975 Hindi movie directed by Arun Bhatt. The film stars Vinod Mehra, Reena Roy, Mehmood, Om Prakash & Others.

Plot

After being thrown out of his house by his father, the smuggler Sunder is forced to live a simple life and in doing so manages to reform himself and become the good son that his father always dreamed of.

Cast
Vinod Mehra as Mahesh Sharma
Reena Roy as Lata
Mehmood as Nandlal
Om Prakash as Banwari Sharma
Urmila Bhatt as Janki Sharma
Chandrashekhar as Chaudhary Sahib

Music

The music of the film was composed by Kalyanji–Anandji.

Awards
Filmfare Best Comedian Award for Mehmood

References

External links 
 

1975 films
1970s Hindi-language films